Iedera is a commune in Dâmbovița County, Muntenia, Romania with a population of 3,550 people. It is composed of four villages: Colibași, Cricovu Dulce, Iedera de Jos (the commune center) and Iedera de Sus.

References

Communes in Dâmbovița County
Localities in Muntenia